Italy competed at the 1987 Mediterranean Games in Latakia, Syria.

Medals

Athletics

Men

Women

See also
 Boxing at the 1987 Mediterranean Games
 Swimming at the 1987 Mediterranean Games
 Volleyball at the 1987 Mediterranean Games

References

External links
 Mediterranean Games Athletic results at Gbrathletics.com
 1987 - Latakia (SYR) at CIJM web site

Nations at the 1987 Mediterranean Games
1987
Mediterranean Games